Laveyrune is a commune in the Ardèche department in southern France.  The Robert Louis Stevenson Trail (GR 70), a popular long-distance path, runs through the village.

Population

See also
Communes of the Ardèche department

References

Communes of Ardèche
Ardèche communes articles needing translation from French Wikipedia